European Smaller Companies Trust, formerly TR European Growth Trust, is a large British investment trust focused on investments in smaller European companies. Established in 1990, the company is a constituent of the FTSE 250 Index, an index of the larger companies on the London Stock Exchange. The company is manged by Janus Henderson and the chairman is Christopher Casey.

History
The company was established under the management of Henderson Group in 1990. It changed its name from TR European Growth Trust to European Smaller Companies Trust in October 2021.

References

External links
   Official site

Investment trusts of the United Kingdom
Companies listed on the London Stock Exchange